is a town situated in the forest of Thuringia in the district of Wartburgkreis in Germany, immediately next to the Rennsteig. Thal and Kittelsthal are parts of the town.

History
Within the German Empire (1871-1918), part of Ruhla belonged to the Grand Duchy of Saxe-Weimar-Eisenach and part to the Duchy of Saxe-Coburg and Gotha.

Culture and sights

Church of St. Concordia
The church was built in 1660-61 and has never been changed since then.

It is one of about eight angle churches in Germany and is considered to be among the two "real" angle churches, i.e. it was originally built as an angle church whereas the other churches only became angle churches after some reconstruction. The church consists of two wings that are situated at a right angle. Where the two wings meet there is the spire and the altar space from where both wings can be overlooked.

Since Ruhla was largely spared from destruction during World War I and II, St Concordia was not affected either. Hence it is the only angle church that has been conserved unaltered and in its original state since its first construction. Since 2004 it is home to the series "Kultur im Winkel" (Culture in the angle [of the church]).

Mini-a-thür

It was the birthplace of the composer Friedrich Lux. One of his operas is called The Blacksmith of Ruhla.

Personalities 

Friedrich Lux (1820-1895), organist and composer
Alexander Ziegler (1822-1887), travel writer and philanthropist  
Bruno Hassenstein (1839-1902), German cartographer
Arno Schlothauer (1872-1942), author, poet and researcher
Dieter Neuendorf (born 1940 in Ruhla), ski jumper
Marko Baacke (born 1980), nordic combiner
Ron Spanuth (born 1980), cross-country skier
Juliane Seyfarth (born 1990), ski jumper

Trivia 
Finkenzuchter - Ruhla was a Mecca of finch farming in the 19th century. This leisure activity was based on the mining tradition of carrying a songbird (to act as an early warning against toxic gases).

In the 1960s, the town had an urban cowherd who, as a tourist attraction, picked up the cows at the gathering place 'calf number' in the summer months.

Steinquader, a stone quarry from the Gerberstein made of Ruhla granite, has been available for over one hundred years at the road crossing at the Glasbachswiese at the Rennsteig. It had been designated as a monument, but had to refrain from transport because of the lack of carrying capacity of the bridges.

References

External links
Church of St. Concordia (Information available in German, English, Dutch, French, Spanish and Italian)

Wartburgkreis
Grand Duchy of Saxe-Weimar-Eisenach
Saxe-Coburg and Gotha